Xinleyizhi is a station on Line 2 of the Shenyang Metro. The station opened on 30 December 2011.This station locates to the west of the Qing Zhao Mausoleum and Beiling Park, also known as Zhaoling or Beiling, and close to the Museum of the Xinle Civilization.

Station Layout

References 

Railway stations in China opened in 2011
Shenyang Metro stations